Hallo Dandy (1974 - 8 January 2007) was a British-bred Thoroughbred racehorse who competed in National Hunt racing.

He raced in 4 Grand Nationals (1983, 1984, 1985, 1986) winning the 1984 race.

He is also known for being discovered in 1994, many years after his retirement, in very poor health highlighting and raising awareness of neglect in ex-racehorses.

Racing career

Hallo Dandy won the 1984 Grand National, ridden by Welsh jockey Neale Doughty. The pairing had finished fourth in the previous year's National.

Before the race he had been a freely available 33/1 chance for the race at the start of 1984, having been pulled up in the Hennessey Cognac Gold Cup but was the subject of huge gambles when the handicapper seemed to have completely underestimated him by raising him just 1 lb in the weights to run carrying ten stones 2 lbs. A good prep race at Ayr and conditions at Aintree suggesting the horse would get the good ground he favoured, as opposed to the soft ground upon which he had tired to finish fourth last year only served to enhance his chances with his backers who sent him off at 13/1.

By the 26th fence Hallo Dandy and last year's runner-up Greasepaint were contesting the lead, which Hallo Dandy took at the second-last and held on to, securing victory by a distance of four lengths. The 1983 winner Corbiere finished third.

He ran in the next two Nationals, falling at the first in 1985 and finishing twelfth in 1986 at the age of 12. He was then retired from racing.

Post-racing career
Following his retirement from racing Hallo Dandy was loaned to the Earl of Onslow, who rode him to hounds with the Fernie Hunt in Leicestershire. However at the age of 20 Hallo Dandy was turned out in a field on Onslow's Surrey estate.

In 1994 he was discovered in a very poor condition and suffering from neglect. The owner, Richard Shaw, took Hallo Dandy back and gifted him to the British Thoroughbred Retraining Centre (BTRC) who nursed him back to health and he became a champion for the welfare of ex-racehorses.

He died in January 2007 at the age of 33.

Grand National record

Pedigree

References 

1974 racehorse births
Racehorses bred in the United Kingdom
Racehorses trained in the United Kingdom
Grand National winners
2007 racehorse deaths